Kadhal Paathai is a 2012 Indian Tamil-language romantic drama film directed by Vyaasan and starring debutante Vinod Kumar and Vidhya.

Plot 
In Kodaikanal, a shoemaker (played by Vinod Kumar) lives in the same area as a girl (played by Vidya) from a rich family who is staying at her grandmother's house and studying at a college. The shoemaker falls in love with to girl much to her father's despise. Her father sends goons to attack the shoemaker. Both the shoemaker and the girl flee to Agra.

Cast 
Vinod Kumar
Vidhya
Mansoor Ali Khan as a drunkard
Thalaivasal Vijay 
Sanjana Singh
Sathyapriya 
Theepetti Ganesan
Suman Shetty
 Tarzan
Neelima Rani

Production 
The film is about a journey across twelve states from Kodaikonal to Agra. Debutante Vinod Kumar and Vidhya play the lead roles in the film. The film is a romantic film and the backdrop of Agra was chosen because the Taj Mahal is a symbol of love.

Soundtrack  
The songs are composed by S. S. Kumaran. FEFSI Siva, Srinivas, and Kalaipuli Sekar attended the audio launch.

Release 
A critic from The Times of India wrote that "Kaadhal Paadhai is a romance-cum-road movie, but the best parts are neither the romance nor the road trip". A critic from Maalai Malar praised the cinematography and the music. A critic from Kungumam praised the performance of Mansoor Ali Khan.

References 

2012 romantic drama films
2012 films
Indian romantic drama films
2010s Tamil-language films